The 22nd New York State Legislature, consisting of the New York State Senate and the New York State Assembly, met from August 9, 1798, to April 3, 1799, during the fourth year of John Jay's governorship, in Albany.

Background
Under the provisions of the New York Constitution of 1777, amended by the re-apportionment of March 4, 1796, Senators were elected on general tickets in the senatorial districts for four-year terms. They were divided into four classes, and every year about one fourth of the Senate seats came up for election. Assemblymen were elected countywide on general tickets to a one-year term, the whole assembly being renewed annually.

In March 1786, the Legislature enacted that future Legislatures meet on the first Tuesday of January of each year unless called earlier by the governor. In 1797, Albany was declared the State capital, and all subsequent Legislatures have been meeting there ever since.

On April 26, 1797, State Senator Joshua Sands was appointed as Collector of the Port of New York; and on September 24, 1797, State Senator Andrew Onderdonk died; leaving two vacancies in the Southern District.

U.S. Senator John Sloss Hobart (Fed.) vacated his seat on April 16, 1798, when he was appointed to the United States District Court for the District of New York, and on May 5, Gov. John Jay appointed William North (Fed.) to fill the vacancy temporarily.

In 1798, Chenango County was created from parts of Herkimer and Tioga counties, and was apportioned two seats in the Assembly, one each taken from Herkimer and Tioga. Oneida County was created from Herkimer, and was apportioned three seats in the Assembly, taken from Herkimer. Rockland County was created from Orange County, and was apportioned one seat in the Assembly, taken from Orange. Besides, two seats from Ulster Co. and one seat from Albany Co. were transferred to Orange Co.

At this time the politicians were divided into two opposing political parties: the Federalists and the Democratic-Republicans.

Elections
The State election was held from April 24 to 26, 1798. Gov. John Jay and Lt. Gov. Stephen Van Rensselaer (both Fed.) were re-elected.

Senators Ambrose Spencer (Middle D.), Leonard Gansevoort (Eastern D.), John Frey and Thomas R. Gold (both Western D.) were re-elected. David Gelston, John Schenck (both Southern D.), Ebenezer Foote (Middle D.), John Sanders (Eastern D.); and Assemblymen DeWitt Clinton (Southern D.) and Frederick Gettman (Western D.) were also elected to full terms in the Senate. Senator Richard Hatfield (Southern D.) was re-elected, but only to a one-year term to fill a vacancy. Assemblyman William Denning (Southern D.) was elected to the Senate to a two-year term, to fill the other vacancy.

Sessions
Gov. Jay called a special session of the Legislature when it seemed that a war with France was likely to break out, and he deemed it necessary to prepare the State for defence. The Legislature met on August 9, 1798, at the Old City Hall in Albany, New York; and adjourned on August 27.

Federalist Dirck Ten Broeck was re-elected Speaker with 58 votes against 37 for Dem.-Rep. John Swartwout.

On August 17, 1798, the Legislature elected James Watson (Fed.) to fill the vacancy in the U.S. Senate.

The Legislature met for the regular session on January 2, 1799; and both Houses adjourned on April 3.

Near the end of the session, an "Act for Supplying the City of New-York with Pure and Wholesome Water" was passed, which contained hidden in its text the charter to set up the Bank of the Manhattan Company.

State Senate

Districts
The Southern District (9 seats) consisted of Kings, New York, Queens, Richmond, Suffolk and Westchester counties.
The Middle District (12 seats) consisted of Dutchess, Orange, Ulster, Columbia, Delaware and Rockland counties.
The Eastern District (11 seats) consisted of Washington, Clinton, Rensselaer, Albany and Saratoga counties.
The Western District (11 seats) consisted of  Montgomery, Herkimer, Ontario, Otsego, Tioga, Onondaga, Schoharie, Steuben, Chenango and Oneida counties.

Note: There are now 62 counties in the State of New York. The counties which are not mentioned in this list had not yet been established, or sufficiently organized, the area being included in one or more of the abovementioned counties.

Members
The asterisk (*) denotes members of the previous Legislature who continued in office as members of this Legislature. William Denning, DeWitt Clinton and Frederick Gettman changed from the Assembly to the Senate.

Employees
Clerk: Abraham B. Bancker

State Assembly

Districts

Albany County (9 seats)
Chenango County (2 seats)
Clinton County (1 seat)
Columbia County (6 seats)
Delaware County (2 seats)
Dutchess County (10 seats)
Herkimer County (3 seats)
Kings County (1 seat)
Montgomery County (6 seats)
The City and County of New York (13 seats)
Oneida County (3 seats)
Onondaga County (2 seats)
Ontario and Steuben counties (2 seats)
Orange County (5 seats)
Otsego County (4 seats)
Queens County (4 seats)
Rensselaer County (6 seats)
Richmond County (1 seat)
Rockland County (1 seat)
Saratoga County (5 seats)
Schoharie County (1 seat)
Suffolk County (4 seats)
Tioga County (1 seat)
Ulster County (5 seats)
Washington County (6 seats)
Westchester County (5 seats)

Note: There are now 62 counties in the State of New York. The counties which are not mentioned in this list had not yet been established, or sufficiently organized, the area being included in one or more of the abovementioned counties.

Assemblymen
The asterisk (*) denotes members of the previous Legislature who continued as members of this Legislature.

Employees
Clerk: James Van Ingen
Sergeant-at-Arms: Robert Hunter
Doorkeeper: Peter Hansen

Notes

Sources
The New York Civil List compiled by Franklin Benjamin Hough (Weed, Parsons and Co., 1858) [see pg. 108f for Senate districts; pg. 117 for senators; pg. 148f for Assembly districts; pg. 172 for assemblymen]
Election result Assembly, Dutchess Co. at project "A New Nation Votes", compiled by Phil Lampi, hosted by Tufts University Digital Library
Election result Assembly, Montgomery Co. at project "A New Nation Votes"
Election result Assembly, Saratoga Co. at project "A New Nation Votes"
Election result Assembly, Washington Co. at project "A New Nation Votes"
Election result Assembly Speaker at project "A New Nation Votes"

1798 in New York (state)
1799 in New York (state)
022